Kearns is an anglicized Irish surname of Ó Céirín. Notable people with the surname include:

Alicia Kearns, British politician elected 2019
 Anthony Kearns (born 1971), Irish musician
 Austin Kearns (born 1980), baseball player
 Billy Kearns (1923-1992), American actor, seen in french films (1958-1991)
 Bracken Kearns (born 1981), Canadian ice hockey player
 Burt Kearns (born 1956), American author and television & film producer
 Daniel Kearns (footballer) (born 1991), Irish footballer
 Daniel Kearns (designer) (born 1975), Irish menswear designer
 Daniel F. Kearns (1896–1963), American military aviator
 Dan Kearns (born 1956), Canadian football player
 David T. Kearns (1930–2011), American CEO of Xerox Corporation and Deputy Secretary of Education
 Dennis Kearns (born 1945), Canadian retired ice hockey player
 Doris Kearns Goodwin (born Doris Helen Kearns, 1941), American author
 Gerard Kearns (born 1984), English actor
 Gertrude Kearns (born 1950), Canadian war artist
 H.G.H. Kearns (1902–1986), British entomologist
 James Kearns (born 1957), writer of the film John Q
 John Kearns (politician) (1784–1864), Irish-Canadian politician
 John Kearns (footballer) (1883–1928), British footballer
 John Kearns (comedian) (born 1987), British comedian
 Joseph Kearns (1907–1962), American actor
 Martin Kearns (1977-2015), English drummer
 Michael Kearns (actor) (born 1950), American actor
 Michael Kearns (computer scientist), American computer scientist
 Mick Kearns (born 1950), Irish footballer 
 Mike Kearns (1929–2009), American professional basketball player
 Mogue Kearns (died 1798), United Irishmen during the 1798 Rebellion
 Ollie Kearns (born 1956), English footballer
 Peter Kearns (1937–2014), English  footballer 
 Phil Kearns (born 1967), Australian former rugby union player
 Robert Kearns (1927–2005), inventor of the intermittent windshield wiper
 Steve Kearns (born 1956), Canadian football player
 Thomas Kearns (1862–1918), early United States Senator from Utah
 William Henry Kearns (1794–1846), Irish composer

English-language surnames
Surnames of Irish origin
Anglicised Irish-language surnames